Mercury(I) nitrate is a inorganic compound, a salt of mercury and nitric acid with the formula Hg2(NO3)2.  A yellow solid, the compound is used as a precursor to other complexes of Hg22+ complexes.The structure of the hydrate has been determined by X-ray crystallography.  It consists of a [H2O-Hg-Hg-OH2]2+ center, with a Hg-Hg distance of 254 pm.

Reactions
Mercury(I) nitrate is formed when elemental mercury is combined with dilute nitric acid (concentrated nitric acid will yield mercury(II) nitrate). Mercury(I) nitrate is a reducing agent which is oxidized upon contact with air.

Mercuric nitrate reacts with elemental mercury to form mercurous nitrate.

Solutions of mercury(I) nitrate are acidic due to slow reaction with water:
Hg2(NO3)2 + H2O ⇌ Hg2(NO3)(OH) + HNO3
Hg2(NO3)(OH) forms a yellow precipitate.

If the solution is boiled or exposed to light, mercury(I) nitrate undergoes a disproportionation reaction yielding elemental mercury and mercury(II) nitrate:
Hg2(NO3)2 ⇌ Hg + Hg(NO3)2

These reactions are reversible; the nitric acid formed can redissolve the basic salt.

References

Mercury(I) compounds
Nitrates